Blood and Steel may refer to:

 Titanic: Blood and Steel, 2012 television drama series about the construction of the RMS Titanic
 Blood and Steel (1925 film), American silent western drama film
 Blood and Steel (1959 film), American drama film